The International Ski Federation (FIS) Alpine Ski World Cup is the premier circuit for alpine skiing competition. The inaugural season launched in January 1967, and the  season marks the 57th consecutive year for the FIS World Cup.

This season started in October 2022 in Sölden, Austria, and is intended to conclude in mid-March 2023 at the finals in Soldeu, Andorra. 

Marco Odermatt and Mikaela Shiffrin are the defending overall champions from the 2021–22 season.

On 24 January, Shiffrin passed the previous record held by Lindsey Vonn for the most wins in the Women's World Cup (83), and was tied with overall record holder Ingemar Stenmark (86). 	
On 11 March, Shiffrin made her 87th World Cup victory by winning the women's slalom in Åre, thereby overtaking Stenmark's 34 year-old record.

47th FIS Alpine World Ski Championships in France, the highlight of the season, was held from 6–19 February 2023, on two different but nearby ski venues in French Alps; the "Roc de Fer" course in Méribel hosted all women's events and all parallel events, and the "L'Éclipse" course in Courchevel hosted the five classic men's events (downhill, Super-G, giant slalom, slalom, and combined).

There have been many cancelations and replacements in the season due to hard weather conditions or lack of snow.  The only parallel event for both men and women was canceled and not replaced, as well as four downhills for the men and two downhills and a Super-G for the women.

Map of world cup hosts 
All 38 locations hosting world cup events for men (25), women (24), and shared (10) this season.

 Women
 Men
 Shared

Men
The number of races in the World Cup history

after DH in Soldeu (15 March 2023)

Calendar

Rankings

Overall

Downhill

Super-G

Giant slalom

Slalom

Women
The number of races in the World Cup history

after SG in Soldeu (16 March 2023)

Calendar

Rankings

Overall

Downhill

Super-G

Giant slalom

Slalom

Alpine team event
World Cup history in real time

after PG in Soldeu  (18 March 2022)

Calendar

*Reserve Skiers

Nations Cup

Overall

Men

Women

Prize money
Source:

Top-5 men

Top-5 women

Podium table by nation 
Table showing the World Cup podium places (gold–1st place, silver–2nd place, bronze–3rd place) by the countries represented by the athletes.

Achievements 
First World Cup career victory 

Men
 Alexander Steen Olsen (21), in his 3rd season – Slalom in Palisades Tahoe

Women 
 Valérie Grenier (26), in her 8th season – Giant Slalom in Kranjska Gora
 Anna Swenn-Larsson (31), in her 12th season – Slalom in Killington
 Kajsa Vickhoff Lie (24), in her 6th season – Downhill in Kvitfjell

First World Cup podium 

Men
 Alexander Steen Olsen (21), in his 3rd season – Slalom in Palisades Tahoe – 1st place
   Stefan Rogentin (28), in his 7th season – Super-G in Wengen – 2nd place
 Florian Schieder (27), in his 6th season – Downhill in Kitzbühel – 2nd place
 AJ Ginnis (28), in his 7th season – Slalom in Chamonix – 2nd place
 Andreas Sander (33), in his 15th season – Super-G in Aspen – 2nd place
 Mattia Casse (32), in his 13th season – Downhill in Val Gardena/Gröden – 3rd place
 Albert Popov (25), in his 9th season – Slalom in Palisades Tahoe – 3rd place

Women
 Valérie Grenier (26), in her 8th season – Giant Slalom in Kranjska Gora – 1st place
 Leona Popović (25), in her 8th season – Slalom in Soldeu – 2nd place
 Laura Gauché (27), in her 10th season – Downhill in Crans Montana – 3rd place
 Zrinka Ljutić (19), in her 3rd season – Slalom in Špindlerův Mlýn – 3rd place

Number of wins this season (in brackets are all-time wins) 

Men
   Marco Odermatt – 13 (24)
 Aleksander Aamodt Kilde – 8 (21)
 Vincent Kriechmayr – 4 (16)
 Lucas Braathen – 3 (5)
 Henrik Kristoffersen – 2 (30)
   Daniel Yule – 2 (6)
   Ramon Zenhäusern – 2 (6)
 Clément Noël – 1 (10)
 Marco Schwarz – 1 (5)
   Loïc Meillard – 1 (2)
 Alexander Steen Olsen – 1 (1)

Women
 Mikaela Shiffrin – 14 (88) 
 Sofia Goggia – 5 (22)
   Lara Gut-Behrami – 3 (37)
 Petra Vlhová – 2 (28)
 Ilka Štuhec – 2 (11)
   Wendy Holdener – 2 (5)
 Federica Brignone – 1 (21)
 Marta Bassino – 1 (6)
   Corinne Suter – 1 (5)
 Cornelia Hütter – 1 (4)
 Elena Curtoni – 1 (3)
 Ragnhild Mowinckel – 1 (3)
 Lena Dürr – 1 (2)
 Nina Ortlieb – 1 (2)
 Valérie Grenier – 1 (1)
 Anna Swenn-Larsson – 1 (1)
 Kajsa Vickhoff Lie – 1 (1)

Retirements
The following athletes announced their retirements during or after the season:

Men
   Mauro Caviezel
 Johan Clarey
   Beat Feuz
 Travis Ganong
 Maximilian Lahnsteiner
 Matteo Marsaglia
 Matthias Mayer
 Leif Kristian Nestvold-Haugen
 Steven Nyman
 Trevor Philp
 Brice Roger

Women
 Coralie Frasse Sombet
 Marie-Michèle Gagnon
 Riikka Honkanen
 Meta Hrovat
 Jonna Luthman
 Nastasia Noens
 Andreea Oprescu
 Esther Paslier
 Nicole Schmidhofer
 Tessa Worley

See also
2022–23 FIS Alpine Ski Continental Cup
2022–23 FIS Alpine Ski Europa Cup
2022–23 FIS Alpine Ski Nor-Am Cup
2022 FIS Alpine Ski South American Cup
2022–23 FIS Alpine Ski Australia-New Zealand Cup

Notes

References 

 
FIS Alpine Ski World Cup
World Cup
World Cup
Alpine ski